William Fields House is a historic home located at Greensboro, Guilford County, North Carolina. It was built between 1875 and 1879, and is a -story, three-bay, "T"-plan Gothic Revival style brick dwelling with a one-story rear wing.

It was listed on the National Register of Historic Places in 1985.

References

Houses on the National Register of Historic Places in North Carolina
Gothic Revival architecture in North Carolina
Houses completed in 1879
Houses in Greensboro, North Carolina
National Register of Historic Places in Guilford County, North Carolina